The 1980 Garden State Bowl, part of the 1980 bowl game season, took place on December 14, 1980, at Giants Stadium in East Rutherford, New Jersey. The competing teams were the Navy Midshipmen, which competed as a football independent, and the Houston Cougars, representing the Southwest Conference (SWC). Houston dominated both sides of the ball in their 35–0 shutout of the Midshipmen. This would prove to be Houston's last bowl game win for almost three decades, until the 2008 Armed Forces Bowl, when the Cougars finally snapped an eight-game bowl losing streak.

Teams

Houston

The 1980 Houston squad finished their regular season 6–5 and tied for second place in the Southwest Conference. The Cougars lost to Arizona State, Miami (FL), Baylor, Texas and Rice. They accepted an invitation to play in the Garden State Bowl against Navy on November 15. The appearance was the first for Houston in the Garden State Bowl and their 10th overall bowl appearance.

Navy

The 1980 Navy squad finished their regular season 8–3. The Midshipmen lost to Virginia, Air Force and Notre Dame. They accepted an invitation to play in the Garden State Bowl against Houston on November 15 following their victory over Georgia Tech. The appearance was the first for Navy in the Garden State Bowl and their 8th overall bowl appearance.

Game summary
After recovering a Navy fumble on their first drive, Houston scored their first of five rushing touchdowns when Terald Clark ran it in from one-yard out. After Leo Truss blocked a punt, the Cougars drove 43-yards for their second first-quarter touchdown on a one-yard Terry Elston run. Early in the second quarter, Navy had their best scoring opportunity of the afternoon after a Houston turnover. However, Steve Fehr missed a 27-yard field goal and Houston retained their shutout. The Cougars then extended their lead to 28–0 at halftime after touchdown runs of 16 and 26 yards by David Barrett and then Clark. Clark then scored the final points of the game in the third quarter after Clark's third touchdown of the day on a two-yard run. For his 163 yards and three touchdowns, Terald Clark was named the MVP of the game.

References

Garden State Bowl
Garden State Bowl
Houston Cougars football bowl games
Navy Midshipmen football bowl games
1980 in sports in New Jersey
December 1980 sports events in the United States